Fab Lab Barcelona is a centre of production, investigation and education, that uses last generation (as of 2008) computer-assisted design software for the creation of prototypes and scale models for Architecture, Construction, Industrial Design and any activity that needs the connection to a computer to manipulate materials according to digital instructions.

Work Areas
Fab Lab Pro: to serve as place for prototype and scale models manufacture for professionals and companies of any field related to Design.

Fab Lab Masters: to serve as research and high education centre, mainly tie to the Institute for Advanced Architecture of Catalonia’s Master Program, for national and international professionals and organizations.

Central Fab Lab: to serve as educational centre for young people and children, according to the principles of Bits and Atoms Centre of the MIT, thus participating in the worldwide network of Fab Labs.

See also

External links
 Fab Lab Barcelona
 Centre for Bits and Atoms of MIT
 Department of Architecture, MIT

Technical universities and colleges
Universities in Catalonia
Education in Barcelona
International schools in Spain
Industrial design